The 1968 Arkansas Razorbacks football team represented the University of Arkansas in the Southwest Conference (SWC) during the 1968 NCAA University Division football season. In their 11th year under head coach Frank Broyles, the Razorbacks compiled a 10–1 record (6–1 against SWC opponents), shared the SWC championship, and outscored all opponents by a combined total of 350 to 189.  The team finished the season ranked #6 in the final AP Poll and #9 in the final UPI Coaches Poll and went on to defeat Georgia in the 1969 Sugar Bowl. Offensive guard Jim Barnes was selected by the AP and Central Press as a first-team player on the 1968 College Football All-America Team.

Schedule

Roster

Sugar Bowl

Georgia's number-one ranked defense matched up against Arkansas ninth-ranked offense on New Year's Day in New Orleans.

Razorback QB Bill Montgomery led the only scoring drive, capped with a 23-yard strike to Chuck Dicus. Georgia responded with David McKnight tackling Razorback Bill Burnett in the end zone for a safety, after which Razorback kicker Bob White took over, adding three unanswered field goals. The game ended with a 16–2 Razorback win. Chuck Dicus caught twelve passes for 169 yards and a score, and was named player of the game.

References

Arkansas
Arkansas Razorbacks football seasons
Southwest Conference football champion seasons
Sugar Bowl champion seasons
Arkansas Razorbacks football